Tischeria is a genus of moths in the family Tischeriidae. The genus Coptotriche was long treated as a synonym of Tischeria, but is now considered distinct.

Selected species

Tischeria ambigua Braun, 1915
Tischeria antilope Puplesis, Diškus and Mey, 2003
Tischeria bifurcata Braun, 1915
Tischeria ceanothi Walsingham, 1890
Tischeria decidua Wocke, 1876
Tischeria deliquescens Meyrick, 1915
Tischeria dodonaea Stainton, 1858
Tischeria ekebladella Bjerkander, 1795
Tischeria ekebladioides Puplesis & Diskus, 2003
Tischeria elongata Walsingham, 1914
Tischeria gouaniae Stonis & Diškus, 2007
Tischeria martinkrugeri Puplesis and Diškus, 2003
Tischeria pulvella Chambers, 1878
Tischeria quercitella Clemens, 1863
Tischeria sparmanniae Puplesis and Diškus, 2003
Tischeria unicolor Walsingham, 1897
Tischeria urticicolella Ghesquière, 1940
Tischeria zestica Meyrick, 1911

Former species

Tischeria admirabilis Braun, 1972
Tischeria aenea Frey & Boll, 1872
Tischeria agrimoniella Braun, 1972
Tischeria ambrosiaeella Chambers, 1875
Tischeria amelanchieris Braun, 1972
Tischeria angusticolella Duponchel, 1843
Tischeria arizonica Braun, 1972
Tischeria astericola Braun, 1972
Tischeria badiiella Chambers, 1875
Tischeria castaneaeella Chambers, 1875
Tischeria citrinipennella Clemens, 1859
Tischeria clemensella Chambers, 1878
Tischeria concolor Zeller, 1875
Tischeria confusa Braun, 1972
Tischeria consanguinea Braun, 1972
Tischeria crataegifoliae Braun, 1972
Tischeria discreta Braun, 1972
Tischeria distincta Braun, 1972
Tischeria explosa Braun, 1923
Tischeria fuscomarginella Chambers, 1875
Tischeria gaunacella Duponchel, 1843
Tischeria gregaria Braun, 1972
Tischeria helianthi Frey & Boll, 1878
Tischeria heliopsisella Chambers, 1875
Tischeria heteroterae Frey & Boll, 1878
Tischeria inexpectata Braun, 1972
Tischeria insolita Braun, 1972
Tischeria longeciliata Frey & Boll, 1878
Tischeria longispicula Puplesis, 1988
Tischeria lucida Braun, 1972
Tischeria malifoliella Clemens, 1860
Tischeria marginata Braun, 1972
Tischeria marginea Haworth, 1928
Tischeria mediostriata Braun, 1927
Tischeria occidentalis Braun, 1972
Tischeria omissa Braun, 1927
Tischeria pallidipennella Braun, 1972
Tischeria purinosella Chambers, 1875
Tischeria rosella Gerasimov, 1937
Tischeria roseticola Frey & Boll, 1873
Tischeria simulata Braun, 1972
Tischeria solidagonifoliella Clemens, 1859
Tischeria splendida Braun, 1972
Tischeria subnubila Braun, 1972
Tischeria sulphurea Frey & Boll, 1878
Tischeria zelleriella Clemens, 1859

External links

Tischeria at funet
Checklist of African Tischeriidae
Tischeriidae Pasaulio faunoje

Tischeriidae
Monotrysia genera
Taxa named by Jacob Hübner
Taxonomy articles created by Polbot